The A. L. Lovejoy House is a historic house in Somerville, Massachusetts.  The three story wood frame Second Empire house was built in the early 1870s for Alvan  Lovejoy, a Boston "fancy goods" dealer who probably commuted using either the street car or steam rail that served Union Square.  The house has a typical Second Empire mansard roof clad in polychrome slate.  Windows are decorated with hoods, and there are decorative brackets on the front entry porch, the roof cornice, and the roof of the projecting front bay.

The house was listed on the National Register of Historic Places in 1989.

See also
National Register of Historic Places listings in Somerville, Massachusetts

References

Houses on the National Register of Historic Places in Somerville, Massachusetts
Houses completed in 1871